On Assignment is an ITV current affairs programme, fronted by ITV News international affairs editor, Rageh Omaar. The programme first aired on 19 March 2014, following ITV News at Ten.

ITV News produces the half-hour programmes, consisting of three long-form reports, focusing on stories across the world, providing colour, background, insight and perspectives on the issues of the moment. Originally broadcast once a month, the series moved to a weekly format in 2017, airing in two series of five episodes a year.

2014 assignments

Episode 1
Original broadcast: 19 March 2014
Mark Austin – Return to Rwanda
Twenty years on from Rwanda's savage genocide, ITV News at Ten newscaster Mark Austin returns to the country. He revisits some of the worst scenes he witnessed during his career as a foreign correspondent and hears powerful stories of survival. He meets those working hard to ensure peace, faith and hope continue to outweigh the horrors of the past - whilst the fear of it happening again hangs in the air.

Robert Moore – Pot in America
Three months ago a new law was implemented in the US state of Colorado. Marijuana is now legal, regulated and taxed. Washington Correspondent Robert Moore travels there to explore how impactful the change in the law has been. He meets the Americans who are enjoying big profits from the 'weed' business and talks to others who think the pro-pot trend is reckless and irresponsible.

Mary Nightingale – Norway's oil fairy-tale
Norway's oil discovery transformed their economy, turning it into one of the richest countries in the world, with an estimated 500 billion pounds saved for future generations. Back in Britain we chose a rather different outcome for our oil wealth. As Scotland ponders an independent future, ITV News at 6:30 newscaster Mary Nightingale finds out how Norway's oil fairy-tale has changed the country and its people.

Episode 2
Original broadcast: 30 April 2014
Rageh Omaar – Slavery Reparations
Recently fourteen Caribbean states came together to launch a united campaign for reparations from Britain, amongst other countries, for the part it played in the slave trade. The group's demands include compensation, an apology and an assurance that it will never happen again. Whilst trillions of pounds in profit from the trade went towards building countries such as Britain, the claim from those willing to sue was that the Caribbean was left poor, illiterate and suffering in extreme poor health. Rageh Omaar journeys to Jamaica to examine what lies behind those claims and he talks to those who are willing to go all the way to the international court in The Hague for justice.
 
John Ray – Hart Island
There is an island in New York that many locals don't even know about. For more than a century, inmates from a nearby prison have been burying the homeless, stillborn babies and unclaimed bodies there. As many as a million lost souls are to be found on Hart Island. It has been described as secret, closed and restrictive. Until now, relatives have been confined to paying their respects at a gazebo at the edge of the shoreline. Diplomatic Correspondent John Ray joins one of eight women who has been campaigning for years to lay flowers at the site of her baby's grave and who now has the opportunity to do so, as Hart Island lifts its lid on its hidden past.
 
Geraint Vincent – Land and Demolitions
Moran hugs her children close as she gazes at the pile of rubble that used to be their home in the Middle East. Her husband Muhammad has his head bowed in humiliation. The soldiers came with their bulldozer during this morning and it took them one hour to destroy the house. Muhammad says his family have lived on this land in East Jerusalem for generations, and that the house was built by his grandfather. The Israeli authorities say the house did not have planning permission, and was therefore an "illegal structure". It is a familiar story in this part of the region, but there is something unique about Middle East Correspondent Geraint Vincent's report. Moran is an Israeli Jew who converted to Islam to marry her Arab husband. Now that their house has been demolished what does the future hold for the couple and their children? And as US Secretary of State John Kerry's timetable for peace talks comes to an end, how much has Israel's policy of construction and destruction done for what little faith in the process there was?

Episode 3 
Original broadcast: Wednesday 28 May 2014

John Irvine investigates rape in India, Rohit Kachroo meets one of South Africa's first black female winemakers, and Lucy Watson reports from China.

Episode 4 
Original broadcast: Wednesday 25 June  2014

Rageh Omaar travels to Nigeria to explore how the country's north-south divide has been exposed by Boko Haram's brutal insurgency.

Episode 5 
Original broadcast: Wednesday 30 July 2014

Geraint Vincent reports on Bucharest's stray dog crisis and Robert Moore is in North Dakota finding out about unmanned drones.

Episode 6 
Original broadcast: Wednesday 22 September 2014

Alastair Stewart visits the ghost town of Varosha in Cyprus, and Julie Etchingham meets a young Afghan woman being helped by UK surgeons.

Episode 7 
Original broadcast: Wednesday 29 September 2014

Mark Austin returns to the Philippines a year after Typhoon Haiyan, and Julie Etchingham is in Berlin 25 years after the fall of the wall.

2015 assignments

2016 assignments

Episode 1
Original broadcast:  26 January 2016
Robert Moore is in Iowa, looking ahead to the American presidential election. Romilly Weeks is in Romania looking at corruption of Romania's political elite in relation to the fire at the Colectiv nightclub in Bucharest on 30 October 2015. Tim Eart, looks at domineering mothers in Italy.

Episode 2
Original broadcast:  1 March 2016
Martin Geissler is in Sweden, looking at the frustration of the nation's asylum policy which allowed 160,000 refugees into the country last year, the highest per capita in all of Europe. Chris Ship is in Spain, looking at bullfighting.  John Ray is in South Africa looking around "Orania" which is a whites-only enclave and one of the last outposts of racial segregation in the country.

Episode 3
Original broadcast:  5 April 2016
Geraint Vincent travels to the Israeli-occupied Golan Heights. Rageh Omaar is in Tehran to find out how a craze for plastic surgery has turned the city into the "nose-job capital of the world". Neil Connery is in Italy to discover the ancient mountaintop town now under threat from nature and the modern world.

Episode 4
Original broadcast:  31 May 2016
Steves Scott looks at the Rio Olympics, Neil Connery looks at the humanitarian crisis facing Yemen, Nina Nannar is in Los Angeles and looks at LA suburbs synonymous with violence and social deprivation

Episode 5
Original broadcast:  28 June 2016

Episode 6
Original broadcast:  30 August 2016

Episode 7
Original broadcast: 27 September 2016

Episode 8
Original broadcast:  25 October 2016

Episode 9
Original broadcast:  22 November 2016
Debbie Edwards looks at parents who became victims of China's one child policy, Emma Murphy look at a charity providing healthcare for excluded Americans, Rachel Younger look at how inspiring example of care and acceptance for the worlds'  vulnerable.

2017 assignments

Episode 1
Original Broadcast:  17 May 2017
Rageh Omaar looks into the failed coup in Turkey, Debi Edward is in Bali, looking how they treat their mentally ill relatives. Tim Ewart is in Poland for his final assignment before he retires.

External links

 

2014 British television series debuts
2020s British television series
British television news shows
ITN
ITV news shows